Achipatti is a Village Panchayat in Coimbatore district in the Indian state of Tamil Nadu. It is suburb of Pollachi. Achipatti pincode is 642002.

Demographics
 India census, Achipatti had a population of 7459. Males constitute 51% of the population and females 49%. Achipatti has an average literacy rate of 75%, higher than the national average of 59.5%; with 55% of the males and 45% of females literate. 10% of the population is under 6 years of age.

References

Villages in Coimbatore district